Teretia turritelloides is an extinct species of sea snail, a marine gastropod mollusk in the family Raphitomidae.

Description

Distribution
Fossils of this marine species were found in Piedmont, Italy.

References

 Bellardi, L. (1847) Monografia delle Pleurotome fossili del Piemonte. Memorie della Reale Accademia delle Scienze di Torino, serie 2 (9), 531–650
 Brunetti, M.; Vecchi, G. (2003). Sul ritrovamento di Teretia elengatissima (Foresti, 1868) in terreni pliocenici dell'Emilia e della Toscana. Bollettino della Società Paleontologica Italiana. 42: 49-57

External links
 Morassi M. & Bonfitto A. (2015). New Indo-Pacific species of the genus Teretia Norman, 1888 (Gastropoda: Raphitomidae). Zootaxa. 3911(4): 560-570 
 

turritelloides
Gastropods described in 1847